WYOU (channel 22) is a television station licensed to Scranton, Pennsylvania, United States, serving as the CBS affiliate for Northeastern Pennsylvania. It is owned by Mission Broadcasting, which maintains a shared services agreement (SSA) with Nexstar Media Group, owner of Wilkes-Barre–licensed NBC affiliate WBRE-TV (channel 28), for the provision of certain services. The two stations share studios on South Franklin Street in downtown Wilkes-Barre, with a news bureau and sales office next to WYOU's former studios on Lackawanna Avenue in downtown Scranton. WYOU's transmitter is located at the Penobscot Knob antenna farm near Mountain Top.

WYOU operates a digital replacement translator on UHF channel 25 that is licensed to Waymart with a transmitter in Forest City. It exists because wind turbines run by NextEra Energy Resources at the Waymart Wind Farm interfere with the transmission of full-power television signals.

History
The station was launched on June 7, 1953, as WGBI-TV. It was owned by the Megargee family and its company, Scranton Broadcasters, along with WGBI radio (910 AM, now WAAF; and 101.3 FM, now WGGY). Studios were located in the basement of Scranton Prep High School on Wyoming Avenue in Downtown Scranton. The station remained at this location for many years even after Scranton Preparatory School moved there. Managed for many years by founder Frank Megargee's daughter Madge Megargee Holcomb, Scranton Broadcasters was at one time probably the only broadcasting company in the country run by five women. This included Mrs. Holcomb, her mother Mrs. Megargee, and Frank Megargee's younger daughters: Katharine Megargee Collins, Mary Megargee Griffin, and Jean Megargee Reap.

Despite its link with one of Northeast Pennsylvania's most prestigious broadcasters (the AM station had been founded in 1925), WGBI-TV operated on a tight budget. For example, the Megargees found AT&T's rates for a dedicated network feed line too high for their liking. This forced station engineers to switch to and from the signal of WCBS-TV in New York City whenever CBS programming was on-the-air. As a result, picture quality for network programming left much to be desired. The switchover was a delicate process requiring tight coordination between engineers stationed around the clock at the transmitter site and directors at the studios since no one there could see the WCBS-TV feed.

WGBI went into a limited partnership with the now-defunct Philadelphia Bulletin in 1958 and was renamed WDAU-TV after WCAU-TV in Philadelphia, which was also owned by the newspaper. The Federal Communications Commission (FCC) ruled that there was so much signal overlap between the two stations that they were effectively a duopoly. Its Grade B signal reaches the Lehigh Valley, which is part of the Philadelphia market. The Bulletin opted to retain WDAU-TV, and sold WCAU-TV to CBS. Even with new ownership, WDAU continued to rebroadcast WCBS-TV's signal for network programming until the 1970s, when complaints about the poor quality of color network programming led it to buy a network feed. The limited partnership was short-lived, as the Bulletin sold its share of WDAU back to the Megargee family in 1959. However, Channel 22 retained the WDAU call sign for three decades even after the Megargees regained full ownership of the station.

Scranton Broadcasters then sold the station to Keystone Broadcasters in 1984. As a result, WDAU severed all remaining ties to the WGBI radio stations (which were retained by the Megargee family until the early 1990s; the stations have since changed their call signs and were eventually acquired by their current owner Entercom). Keystone, in turn, sold the station to Diversified Communications of Portland, Maine in 1986, with the call letters changed to the current WYOU on October 9. Soon afterward, the station moved to facilities on Lackawanna Avenue. The WDAU call sign was later used on what is now WDFX-TV in the Dothan television market (licensed to Ozark).

After carrying Star Trek: Voyager, the station added UPN as a secondary affiliation in June 1995. UPN programming ran primarily on weekends.

WYOU was purchased by Nexstar Broadcasting as its first station property in 1996. In 1998, Nexstar bought rival WBRE and sold WYOU to Mission Broadcasting, but kept control of WYOU's operations under a joint sales agreement with WBRE as the senior partner. Gradually, most operations were consolidated at WBRE's studios. After vacating the larger Lackawanna Avenue facility, Nexstar opened a smaller news bureau and sales office next door.

WYOU still has a film archive dating back to the 1950s. A 1972 flood ruined the film archive in WBRE's basement.

On December 3, 2018, Nexstar announced it would acquire the assets of Chicago-based Tribune Media—which has operated WNEP-TV through a shared services agreement with Dreamcatcher Broadcasting since December 2014—for $6.4 billion in cash and debt. Nexstar was precluded from acquiring WNEP directly or indirectly, as FCC regulations prohibit common ownership of more than two stations in the same media market, or two or more of the four highest-rated stations in the market. (Furthermore, any attempt by Nexstar to assume the operations of WNEP through local marketing or shared services agreements would have been subject to regulatory hurdles that could have delayed completion of the FCC and Justice Department's review and approval process for the acquisition.) As such, on January 31, 2019, Nexstar announced that it would retain WBRE and the SSA for WYOU and sell WNEP to another buyer to address the ownership conflict; it was announced on March 20, 2019, that WNEP would be sold to Tegna Inc. Since Nexstar kept the WBRE/WYOU virtual duopoly, the transaction made them sister stations to MyNetworkTV affiliate WPHL-TV in Philadelphia and ABC affiliate WIVT in Binghamton; Nexstar was also required to sell Tribune-owned New York City CW affiliate WPIX to the E. W. Scripps Company due to ownership cap issues (Nexstar announced that it would transfer an option to repurchase WPIX to WYOU owner Mission Broadcasting, who would exercise that option. The sale was competed on December 30, 2020, with Nexstar operating the station through a Local Marketing Agreement.)

Programming

Syndicated programming
Syndicated programming on WYOU includes Entertainment Tonight, Judge Judy, The Kelly Clarkson Show, and Funny You Should Ask.

News operation

WDAU-TV was a solid runner-up to WBRE, and later ABC affiliate WNEP-TV (channel 16), for much of the time from the 1950s to the 1980s. This was achieved through its coverage of major stories including the Knox Mine Disaster and U.S. Senate hearings on racketeering in the late 1950s. The Associated Press commended the station on its gavel-to-gavel coverage of the Senate hearings and news director Tom Powell was courted by CBS to be a network news anchor. During the 1950s and 1960s, mirroring the longstanding rivalry between Scranton and Wilkes-Barre, WDAU dominated Scranton while WBRE ruled Wilkes-Barre.

In the early 1980s, channel 22 strengthened its hand when it brought in Gary Essex, longtime anchorman at WNEP, and teamed him with popular anchorwoman Debbie Dunleavy. It also became the second station in the market to use a news helicopter as well as the first to air a newscast in drive time.

WYOU remained a solid runner-up to WNEP through the early 1990s. However, after Nexstar began the joint sales agreement with WBRE in 1998, Nexstar began pouring more resources into WBRE. Channel 22's ratings plummeted and would never recover; it has spent most of the new millennium as one of CBS' weakest affiliates—a far cry from the days when it was one of the network's strongest affiliates. Some have referred to WYOU as the "ugly step-sister," since Nexstar has long favored WBRE over WYOU and was reportedly unwilling to make a significant investment in channel 22's news department. Even luring away another former popular WNEP anchorman, Frank Andrews, did not help the cause. He left the station in March 2006 to make a successful bid for a seat in the state house where he served under his real name, Frank Andrews Shimkus.

In 2002, both stations dropped their separate weekday morning and noon newscasts in favor of Pennsylvania Morning and Pennsylvania Midday which were jointly-produced and simulcast on both stations. Both programs were discontinued at the start of 2008, with WYOU replacing Pennsylvania Morning with the 6 o'clock hour of the nationally syndicated morning show, The Daily Buzz, and returning to airing its own noon newscast.

In an effort to become more competitive with dominant WNEP, WYOU and WBRE instituted a major shakeup in format in the fall of 2006. WYOU relaunched its weeknight newscasts with a talk/debate format, with WBRE maintaining a more traditional format, setting a more clear competition against WNEP. Each WYOU weeknight broadcast started off with weather ("StormCenter Weather", another innovation) and a shortened rundown of the day's top stories. The show then focused on an ongoing story, investigation, or topic and brought in analysts and experts to discuss it. Viewers were able to call into the station and participate in the discussions. WYOU generally did a traditional newscast whenever WBRE had programming that bumped its news back by a significant amount of time.

On June 16, 2008, there were several more major changes made on the two stations. Candice Kelly, who anchored on the station, moved to the weeknight newscasts on WBRE. She was joined by newcomer Drew Speier. WYOU and WBRE's midday shows switched anchors. Mark Hiller moved from WBRE's 11 a.m. news to WYOU's noon broadcast, while Eva Mastromatteo switched over to WBRE at 11. Hiller also debuted as anchor of WYOU's new First at 4 weekday broadcast, the first 4 p.m. newscast in the market. This was followed at 4:30 by The Insider which moved from its 7 o'clock slot. WYOU dropped its 5 p.m. show and aired two episodes of Judge Judy. At 6 o'clock, Lyndall Stout (who anchored on WBRE) joined Eric Scheiner for the half-hour WYOU Inter@ctive. The station also launched a new weeknight newscast, WYOU News at 7, to compete against WNEP's 7 p.m. newscast. All of the preceding changes were an attempt to better compete against WNEP.

WYOU and WBRE shared a Williamsport Bureau on West 4th Street, though only WBRE appeared on the sign and WBRE's logo was dominant on the bureau's vehicle. There was no weekend sports anchor on WYOU.

Nexstar announced on April 3, 2009, that WYOU would shut down its news department effective the following day. This resulted in the layoff of fourteen personnel. Syndicated programming aired in place of the newscasts for just under three years. The station saved nearly one million dollars a year from closing down its news department. As a measure of how far WYOU's once-proud news department had fallen, the last Nielsen ratings issued before the shutdown showed its weeknight 11 o'clock newscast only garnered a four percent share. Even with the ending of its separate news department, WYOU struggled to receive even a 3% share of the ratings for syndicated programming in place of former newscasts. The secondary set at WBRE's facilities used to produce the newscasts on WYOU was eventually modified to broadcast an afternoon lifestyle show on WBRE called PA Live.

On April 2, 2012, WBRE began broadcasting its local newscasts in high definition, with a new news set, HD camera and forecasting equipment. With the upgrade, WBRE began producing half-hour newscasts at noon and 7 p.m. on WYOU, and the station began to simulcast WBRE's weekday morning, and nightly 6 and 11 p.m. newscasts (the first such newscasts on WYOU since its in-house news department folded just under three years earlier); these newscasts are also broadcast in high definition. This is a similar operation to existing joint news operations formed by Nexstar/Mission stations the year prior, between WUTR and WFXV in Utica, New York, and WTVW and WEHT in Evansville, Indiana.

Technical information

Subchannels
The station's digital signal is multiplexed:

On June 15, 2016, Nexstar announced that it has entered into an affiliation agreement with Katz Broadcasting for the Escape, Laff, Grit, and Bounce TV networks (the last one of which is owned by Bounce Media LLC, whose COO Jonathan Katz is president/CEO of Katz Broadcasting), bringing the four networks to 81 stations owned and/or operated by Nexstar, including WYOU and WBRE-TV.

Analog-to-digital conversion
WYOU shut down its analog signal, over UHF channel 22, on February 17, 2009, the original target date in which full-power television stations in the United States were to transition from analog to digital broadcasts under federal mandate (which was later pushed back to June 12, 2009). The station's digital signal remained on its pre-transition VHF channel 13. Through the use of PSIP, digital television receivers display the station's virtual channel as its former UHF analog channel 22.

Translator

WYOU serves one of the largest geographic markets in the country. This area is very mountainous making UHF reception difficult. However, the station was in a unique situation since Scranton/Wilkes-Barre was already a "UHF island" before the government mandated digital transition. As a result, WYOU had traditionally operated several translators to repeat and improve its signal throughout the market. However, in March 2010, to reduce operating costs, all owned and operated translators were shut down after Nexstar determined that its new VHF digital signal for WYOU was adequate to reach the entire market without the legacy UHF translator locations. According to nepahdtv.com, this move was met with some dismay from viewers in areas where reception of direct VHF signals from the single Penobscot Knob transmitter still proved difficult if not impossible, even in digital, leaving many rural viewers without access to CBS programming over the air. Despite the apparent decrease in effective coverage, no effort from Nexstar has been made to recommission any of the deactivated translators, presumably due to the very high penetration rate of cable television in the region.

Out-of-market carriage
Just across the Delaware River along the Pennsylvania–New York State border, WYOU is carried on Charter Spectrum in Port Jervis, New York, located in Orange County. It is not carried by Cablevision in nearby Matamoras, Pennsylvania, located in Pike County. Orange County, New York and Pike County, Pennsylvania are both in the New York City market.

References

 Krawczeniuk, Boris.  Pioneering anchorman Tom Powell dies at 76.  Scranton Tribune.  February 25, 2004.
 Mates, Rich.  A look back at 50 years of local television.  The Scranton Times.  July 19, 2003.
 Mates, Rich.  Randy Williams takes new position of station manager at WBRE-TV.  The Scranton Times.  November 13, 2004.
 Mates, Rich.  Reinventing the wheel for morning newscasts.  The Scranton Times.  September 21, 2002.
 Mates, Rich.  Time is now to preserve local television archives.  The Scranton Times.  July 26, 2003.
 Mates, Rich.  WYOU cameraman Jim Keenan reflects on four-decade career.  The Scranton Times.  April 17, 2004.

External links
PAHomepage.com - Official WYOU/WBRE-TV Website

CBS network affiliates
Ion Mystery affiliates
Twist (TV network) affiliates
Cozi TV affiliates
Television channels and stations established in 1953
1953 establishments in Pennsylvania
YOU-TV
Low-power television stations in the United States
Nexstar Media Group